Lake Naivasha is a freshwater lake in Kenya, outside the town of Naivasha in Nakuru County, which lies north west of Nairobi. It is part of the Great Rift Valley.  The name derives from the local Maasai name Nai'posha, meaning "rough water" because of the sudden storms which can arise.

Location

Apart from transient streams, the lake is fed by the perennial Malewa and Gilgil rivers. There is no visible outlet, but since the lake water is relatively fresh it is assumed to have an underground outflow.

The lake had a normal surface area of  before 2010 and had increased to 198 square kilometres (76 sq mi) by 2020. Njorowa Gorge once formed the lake's outlet, but it is now high above the lake and forms the entrance to Hell's Gate National Park. The town of Naivasha (formerly East Nakuru) lies on the north-east edge of the lake.

Ecology

The lake is home to a variety of types of wildlife including over 400 different species of bird and a sizable population of hippos.  The fish community in the lake has been highly variable over time, influenced by changes in climate, fishing effort and the introduction of invasive species.  The most recent shift in the fish population followed the accidental introduction of common carp in 2001.  Nine years later, in 2010, common carp accounted for over 90% of the mass of fish caught in the lake.

There are two smaller lakes in the vicinity of Lake Naivasha: Lake Oloiden and Lake Sonachi (a green crater lake). The Crater Lake Game Sanctuary lies nearby, while the lake shore is known for its population of European immigrants and settlers.

History
Between 1937 and 1950, the lake was used as a landing place for flying boats on the Imperial Airways passenger and mail route from Southampton in Britain to South Africa. It linked Kisumu and Nairobi.  Joy Adamson, the author of Born Free, lived on the shores of the lake in the mid-1960s.  On the shores of the lake is Oserian ("Djinn Palace"), which gained notoriety in the Happy Valley days between the two world wars. It now forms part of the Oserian flower farm.  In 1999, the Lake Naivasha Riparian Association received the Ramsar Wetland Conservation Award for its conservation efforts regarding the Lake Naivasha Ramsar site.

Agriculture and Industry

Floriculture forms the main industry around the lake. However, the largely unregulated use of lake water for irrigation is reducing the level of the lake and is the subject of concern in Kenya.
 
Fishing in the lake is also another source of employment and income for the local population. The lake varies in level greatly and almost dried up entirely in the 1890s. Lake levels in general follow the rainfall pattern in the catchment area.

Lake Naivasha, once described as the Jewel in the Crown of all the East African lakes, has in recent decades been subjected to a series of devastating human pressures, not least the establishment of a vast horticulture and agriculture industry along its shorelines, but also the ever-increasing inflows of nutrients from siltation, sewage and other effluents emanating from a lakeside human population now approaching a million people.

In 1981, the first geothermal plant for Lake Naivasha was commissioned and by 1985, a total of 45 MW of electricity was being generated in the area.

The water level for Lake Naivasha reached a low of 0.6 m depth in 1945,
but the water level rose again, with minor drops, to reach a maximum depth of nearly 6 m in 1968. There was another major decline of the water level in 1987, when the depth reached 2.25 m above the lake bottom.  The decline of the lake water level in 1987 increased concern in the future of geothermal industry, and it was speculated that Lake Naivasha underground water might be feeding the geothermal reservoir at Olkaria. Hence, the decline in the lake water would affect the future of the geothermal industry.

The surface area of the lake had increased by over 50% by 2020 causing many people to be displaced from the densely populated areas round the lake.

References

External links 
 AFP-TV report about the lake drying up

Lakes of the Great Rift Valley
Lakes of Kenya
Endorheic lakes of Africa
Lake Naivasha
Lake Naivasha
Lake Naivasha